Alan Ische (born February 20, 1942) is a Canadian football player who played for the Edmonton Eskimos.

References

Edmonton Elks players
Living people
1942 births